Lehti may refer to:

People
Alexandra Lehti (born 1996), Finnish singer, known as Lxandra
Eero Lehti (born 1944), Finnish businessman

Newspaper
C-lehti, Finnish computer magazine
ET-lehti, Finnish general interest magazine
Kansan Lehti, Finnish former socialist newspaper
Ruijan Suomenkielinen Lehti, Finnish language weekly newspaper
Virallinen lehti, Finnish official newspaper